The Ligue Magnus, currently known as Synerglace Ligue Magnus for sponsorship reasons, is the top men's division of the French ice hockey pyramid, established in 1906. The league operated under a variety of names before taking that of its championship trophy, the Magnus Cup, in 2004. The trophy was in turn named for Frenchman and IIHF founder Louis Magnus.

Teams from the Ligue Magnus can participate in the IIHF's annual Champions Hockey League (CHL), competing for the European Trophy. Participation is based on the strength of the various leagues in Europe (excluding the European/Asian Kontinental Hockey League). Going into the 2022–23 CHL season, the Ligue Magnus was ranked the No. 9 league in Europe, allowing them to send their top team to compete in the CHL.

Format
12 teams play a 44-game regular season. The schedule is fully balanced and there are no geographic conferences. Regulation wins are worth 3 points, as per international rules. The top 8 teams qualify for the Magnus Cup playoffs, with all series contested in a best-of-seven format. The remaining 4 teams play a 6-game round-robin, at the end of which the last-place team is relegated.

The Magnus Cup champions qualify for the following season's Champions Hockey League. All Ligue Magnus teams also take part in the French Cup.

Import rule
Game night rosters must include at least 10 players who have spent 3 or more years in the French hockey system before the age of 21. French citizenship itself is not a requirement to qualify for non-import status, as long as the player meets the above criteria. Conversely, a citizen of France who was fully trained in a foreign country will count as an import regardless of his French citizenship.

Outdoor games
On December 22, 2013, Grenoble and Briançon played an outdoor regular season game at Stade des Alpes, the home of former Ligue 1 soccer club GF38. A sellout attendance of 19,767 set a league record.
Another outdoor game took place on December 30, 2016, when Lyon hosted Grenoble at Parc OL, the home field of seven-time Ligue 1 champions Olympique Lyonnais. The event drew a record 25,182 attendance.

Title sponsors
In 2016, the league signed its first naming rights deal with Saxoprint, the online printing subsidiary of German conglomerate Cewe, and became known as Saxoprint Ligue Magnus for the following two seasons. In 2018, mobile ice rink supplier Synerglace became the series' new title sponsor.

Media

Television
Select regular season and playoff games air on cable and broadband television channel Sport en France.

Internet streaming
All league games can be streamed for a monthly subscription fee of approximately €10. The service, managed by Finnish company Fanseat, employed a man-operated main camera for the first three years, before shifting to PlaySight automated technology in 2019.

Video game
Hockey Dangles '16: Saxoprint Magnus Edition, an arcade-style mobile video game based on the league, was released for Android and iOS devices in September 2016.

2021/22 teams

Former teams
Albatros de Brest
Chamois de Chamonix
Corsaires de Dunkerque
Drakkars de Caen
Ducs de Dijon
Jets de Viry-Essonne
Ours de Villard-de-Lans
Pingouins de Morzine-Avoriaz
Sangliers Arvernes
Avalanche du Mont-Blanc

Defunct teams
Diables Noirs de Tours
Hockey Club de Mulhouse
Séquanes de Besançon
Reims HC

Previous winners

Titles by team

Awards
Charles Ramsay Trophy (top scorer)
Albert Hassler Trophy (most valuable French player)
Marcel Claret Trophy (most sportsmanlike team)
Raymond Dewas Trophy (most sportsmanlike player)
Jean-Pierre Graff Trophy (most promising player)
Jean Ferrand Trophy (most valuable goaltender)
Camil Gélinas Trophy (coach of the year)

Notable players

 Philippe Bozon (St. Louis Blues, Genève-Servette HC)
 Alain Daigle (Chicago Blackhawks)
 Evgeny Davydov (HC CSKA Moscow, Winnipeg Jets)
 Steve Gainey (Dallas Stars, Phoenix Coyotes)
 Cristobal Huet (Los Angeles Kings, Montreal Canadiens, Washington Capitals, Chicago Blackhawks)
 Steve Montador (Calgary Flames, Florida Panthers, Anaheim Ducks, Boston Bruins, Buffalo Sabres)
 Steven Reinprecht (Calgary Flames, Colorado Avalanche, Florida Panthers, Los Angeles Kings, Phoenix Coyotes)
 Mark Rycroft (St. Louis Blues, Colorado Avalanche)
 Richard Sévigny (Montreal Canadiens, Quebec Nordiques)
 Claude Verret (Buffalo Sabres, Lausanne HC, Rochester Americans)
In addition, Bob Gainey (Montreal Canadiens) and Brian Propp (Philadelphia Flyers) have played in the second tier of French hockey.

Notes

References

External links
French Ice Hockey Federation
Ligue Magnus
AJPH (players' association)
Results

 
Recurring sporting events established in 1907
1907 establishments in France
Professional ice hockey leagues in France
Top tier ice hockey leagues in Europe